The Triple Crown of Alpine Skiing consists of three different types of alpine skiing events. A Triple Crown winner wins all three World Cup titles in one season or all three Gold medals at the Winter Olympic Games in the following:
Slalom
Giant Slalom
Downhill

Only two people have ever accomplished the feat. 
Austrian skier Toni Sailer was the first person to win the Triple Crown of Alpine Skiing at the 1956 Winter Olympics
At the 1968 Winter Olympic Games French skier, Jean-Claude Killy won the Triple Crown.

See also
Skiing and skiing topics

Alpine skiing